Culiseta melanura, the black-tailed mosquito, is a species of mosquito in the family Culicidae. Adult female C. melanura primarily take their blood meals from birds and are responsible for transmitting the eastern equine encephalitis virus between birds. Mammals can also become infected with the virus when other genera of mosquito, such as Aedes, Coquillettidia, and Culex, take blood meals first from infected birds and then from mammals, causing transfer of the virus.

Parasites
C. melanura is a vector of Eastern equine encephalitis virus. Scott & Lorez 1998 find EEEV vector infection is not benign, reducing C. melanura lifespan.

References

Culicinae
Articles created by Qbugbot
Insects described in 1902